During the 2007–08 season Associazione Sportiva Roma played the 75th Serie A season in its history.

As in the previous season, Roma finished in second place in Serie A behind Internazionale, but had the chance to win the Championship until the last match.

Further, because giallorossi won the 2006–07 Coppa Italia, they played the Supercoppa Italiana for the second consecutive time against Inter, and won the trophy thanks to a 1–0 victory in the first match of the season in San Siro.

In the European competitions, Roma played 2007–08 UEFA Champions League and, starting from the group stage, beat Real Madrid in the Round of 16, but lost to the eventual champions Manchester United in the quarter-finals.
 
The last match of the season was the 2007–08 Coppa Italia final against Internazionale, the fourth consecutive final between the two teams. The giallorossi won 2–1, their ninth Coppa Italia triumph.

Season review

Pre-season & transfers
Early pre-season was dominated by the protracted talks involving the renewal of Cristian Chivu's contract and the many rumours that linked him to many other teams. In fact, the Romanian defender refused a new contract because he already knew he had an offer of about €4M from Internazionale. For this reason in early June Roma extended Philippe Mexès' contract until 2011 and signed Brazilian 2007 Copa América winning defender Juan from Bayer Leverkusen.

The speculation involving Chivu lasted almost two months, and after that he refused to extend his contract with Roma. The player also turned down offers from Barcelona and Real Madrid, stating that if he was not transferred to Inter he would keep playing for Roma until his contract ran out the summer of 2008. For this reason Roma's supporters saw him as a "traitor" and whistled him during a training session in Stadio Flaminio; even Roma's director of football Daniele Pradé stated that the Romanian defender made "incalculable damage" to the club because Real Madrid's offer was higher than the others. Eventually, on 27 July, when it seemed that Chivu would have been a giallorosso until the end of his contract period, Inter made a final offer of 14M€ plus the co-ownership of Marco Andreolli.

Roma also signed Ludovic Giuly, Mauro Esposito and, at the end of August, Cicinho. The loans of Christian Wilhelmsson and Francesco Tavano were not renewed, while Vincenzo Montella was loaned to Sampdoria as he wanted more first-team football. However, Roma bought full ownership of David Pizarro, Mirko Vučinić and Marco Cassetti.

The signings of Matteo Brighi, Ahmed Barusso, and Vitorino Antunes further enlarged the squad, while young players such as Aleandro Rosi, Ricardo Faty, Stefano Okaka, Valerio Virga, Alessio Cerci, Andrea Giacomini and Daniele Galloppa were loaned to lower league clubs to gain experience.

First part of the season
Roma began the 2007–08 season on 19 August 2007 with the Supercoppa Italiana in San Siro against Internazionale. In the previous season, Roma had lost the Supercoppa 4–3, but on this occasion succeeded in winning (by 1–0) the second Supercoppa in its history, thanks to a penalty by Daniele De Rossi after a foul by Nicolás Burdisso on Francesco Totti.

The 2007–08 Serie A began with Roma as one of the favourites, after Internazionale, Milan and together with Juventus.

The first matches confirmed pre-season expectations of a successful campaign, as Roma started well with a 2–0 win against Palermo with goals from Philippe Mexès and Alberto Aquilani, who also scored in the second match against Siena.

Roma qualified for the 2007–08 UEFA Champions League after finishing second in the 2006–07 season, qualifying directly to the group stage, where they were drawn from the second pot into Group F, together with Manchester United, Sporting CP and Dynamo Kyiv.

After the pause for Italy's Euro 2008 qualifying matches against France and Ukraine, in which Daniele De Rossi, Simone Perrotta, Christian Panucci and Alberto Aquilani played, Roma entered a difficult period of fixtures over a short span of time: from 16 September until 3 October, the giallorossi played against Reggina (winning 2–0), Dynamo Kyiv (winning 2–0), Juventus (drawing 2–2), Fiorentina (drawing 2–2), Internazionale (losing 4–1) and Manchester United (losing 1–0).

Roma won 2–0 in the first match against the Calabrese team thanks to Juan's first goal, a volley with his heel, and the second goal by Francesco Totti, who also scored in the 2–0 victory against Ukrainian champions Dynamo Kyiv. In the following two games against Juventus and Fiorentina, Roma led 2–1 but failed to hold on for the win, conceding the equalizer in the last minutes of both games.

After having played Juventus on Sunday and Fiorentina on Wednesday, Roma faced champions Inter on Saturday, 29 September. The giallorossi lost 4–1, but the defeat was abetted by a handball in the penalty area from Ludovic Giuly who was sent off and cost Roma a penalty, after which the numerical inferiority and the disadvantage opened the nerazzurri'''s overwhelming victory.  -

After losing their position as Serie A league leaders, Roma had to face Manchester United for the first time since their débâcle the previous season at the hands of the English champions in the quarter-finals where they had lost 7–1 . Roma lost this time too, but missed many chances, and even the scorer game's only goal, Wayne Rooney, stated that "Roma deserved more". In addition to ending the first match of the season without scoring a goal, the giallorossi lost Alberto Aquilani to a groin injury that would keep him out of play for more than a month, preventing him from playing the derby.

Roma won their next match 3–0 against Parma, thanks to two goals by Francesco Totti and one by Mancini, thus leaving behind a poor run of two draws and two defeats before the break for the Euro 2008 qualifying matches. After the international break Roma played out a thrilling 4–4 draw against Napoli.

In the third Champions League group stage match, Roma had to face Sporting CP and, though Totti was injured, the team won thanks to goals by Juan and Mirko Vučinić, who dribbled two Portuguese defenders before scoring and assuring Roma second place in Group F, after three matches. The Montenegrin captain was also the protagonist of the second consecutive victory in San Siro against Milan, scoring the only goal of the game.

On 31 October 2007 the giallorossi played the Derby della Capitale against Lazio without three important first team players (Totti, Alberto Aquilani and Rodrigo Taddei), all out with injury. Despite this, Roma won 3–2 thanks to the third goal in three matches from Mirko Vučinić (evening the score after a goal from Lazio's Tommaso Rocchi), the second goal of the league campaign for Mancini and the winning goal by Simone Perrotta.

Players

Squad informationLast updated on 18 May 2008Appearances include league matches only''

Transfers

In

Out

Competitions

Overall

Last updated: 24 May 2008

Supercoppa Italiana

Serie A

League table

Results summary

Results by round

Matches

Coppa Italia

Round of 16

Quarter-finals

Semi-finals

Final

UEFA Champions League

Group stage

Knockout phase

Round of 16

Quarter-finals

Statistics

Appearances and goals

|-
! colspan=14 style="background:#B21B1C; color:#FFD700; text-align:center"| Goalkeepers

|-
! colspan=14 style="background:#B21B1C; color:#FFD700; text-align:center"| Defenders

|-
! colspan=14 style="background:#B21B1C; color:#FFD700; text-align:center"| Midfielders

|-
! colspan=14 style="background:#B21B1C; color:#FFD700; text-align:center"| Forwards

|-
! colspan=14 style="background:#B21B1C; color:#FFD700; text-align:center"| Players transferred out during the season

Goalscorers

Last updated: 24 May 2008

Clean sheets

Last updated: 24 May 2008

Disciplinary record

Last updated:

References

A.S. Roma seasons
Roma